Ectoedemia mauni is a moth of the family Nepticulidae. It was described by Scoble in 1979. It is known from Botswana.

The larvae feed on Commiphora africana.

References

Nepticulidae
Moths described in 1979
Endemic fauna of Botswana
Moths of Africa
Taxa named by Malcolm Scoble